Khalid U. Abdullah (born March 6, 1979) is a former American and Canadian football player. His brother is Rahim Abdullah, who played linebacker for the Cleveland Browns. He played in 12 regular season games for the Calgary Stampeders of the Canadian Football League in the 2006 CFL season but was a pre-season cut in 2007. He eventually signed with the Montreal Alouettes on October 5, 2007, and played in four regular season games.

References

1979 births
Living people
Players of American football from Jacksonville, Florida
American football linebackers
Cincinnati Bengals players
Canadian football linebackers
Calgary Stampeders players
Montreal Alouettes players
Mars Hill Lions football players
Players of Canadian football from Florida